The black-crested bulbul (Rubigula flaviventris) is a member of the bulbul family of passerine birds. It is found from the Indian subcontinent to southeast Asia.

Taxonomy and systematics
The black-crested bulbul was originally described in the genus Vanga and later moved to genus Pycnonotus. Pycnonotus was found to be polyphyletic in recent molecular phylogenetic studies and five bulbul species, including the black-crested bulbul, moved to Rubigula.  

Until 2008, the black-crested bulbul was considered as conspecific with the black-capped, ruby-throated, flame-throated and Bornean bulbuls.

Subspecies
Eight subspecies are recognized:
 Black-crested yellow bulbul (P. f. flaviventris) - (Tickell, 1833): Found from Nepal, northern and eastern India (including Pachmarhi in central India) to southern China and central Myanmar 
 P. f. vantynei - Deignan, 1948: Found from eastern and southern Myanmar to southern China and northern Indochina
 P. f. xanthops - Deignan, 1948: Found in south-eastern Myanmar and western Thailand
 P. f. auratus - Deignan, 1948: Found in north-eastern Thailand and western Laos
 P. f. johnsoni - (Gyldenstolpe, 1913): Originally described as a separate species. Found in central and eastern Thailand, southern Indochina
 P. f. elbeli - Deignan, 1954: Found on islands off eastern coast of Thailand
 P. f. negatus - Deignan, 1954: Found in southern Myanmar and south-western Thailand
 P. f. caecilii - Deignan, 1948: Found on the northern Malay Peninsula

Description
The black-crested bulbul is generally about 19 cm in length. As the name suggests, the head of this bulbul is black while the rest of its body is different shades of yellow. Both the male and female are similar in plumage. One can make out a younger bird by its slightly duller coloring.

Distribution and habitat
This is a bird of forest and dense scrub.

Behaviour and ecology
It builds its nest in a bush; two to four eggs are a typical clutch. The black-crested bulbul feeds on fruit and insects.

References

 Birds of India by Grimmett, Inskipp and Inskipp, 
 Rasmussen, P.C., and J.C. Anderton (2005). Birds of South Asia. The Ripley Guide. Volume 2: Attributes and Status. Smithsonian Institution and Lynx Edicions, Washington D.C. and Barcelona.

black-crested bulbul
Birds of East India
Birds of Nepal
Birds of Eastern Himalaya
Birds of South China
Birds of North India
Birds of Yunnan
Birds of Southeast Asia
black-crested bulbul